Salmon is a common food fish classified as an oily fish with a rich content of protein and omega-3 fatty acids. In Norway – a major producer of farmed and wild salmon – farmed and wild salmon differ only slightly in terms of food quality and safety, with farmed salmon having lower content of environmental contaminants, and wild salmon having higher content of omega-3 fatty acids.

Colour 

Salmon flesh is generally orange to red, although there are some examples of white-fleshed wild salmon. The natural color of salmon results from carotenoid pigments, largely astaxanthin and canthaxanthin in the flesh. Wild salmon get these carotenoids from eating krill and other tiny shellfish.

The concentration of carotenoids (mainly canthaxanthin and astaxanthin) exceeds 8 mg/kg of flesh, and all fish producers try to reach a level that represents a value of 16 on the "Roche Colour Card", a colour card used to show how pink the fish will appear at specific doses. This scale is specific for measuring the pink colour due to astaxanthin and is not for the orange hue obtained with canthaxanthin. The development of processing and storage operations, which can be detrimental on canthaxanthin flesh concentration, has led to an increased quantity of pigments added to the diet to compensate for the degrading effects of the processing. In wild fish, carotenoid levels of up to 25 mg are present, but levels of canthaxanthin are, in contrast, minor.

Nutrition
Raw wild salmon is 70% water, 20% protein, 6% fat, and contains no carbohydrates (table). In a 100 gram reference amount, raw salmon supplies 142 calories, and is a rich source (20% or more of the Daily Value, DV) of several B vitamins, especially vitamin B12 at 133% DV, selenium (52% DV), and phosphorus (29% DV). Dietary minerals in moderate content are copper (15% DV) and potassium (10% DV).

Contaminants
PCBs, metformin, and mercury are some of the pollutants found in wild salmon, caught close to wastewater treatment plants of major metropolitan areas in the United States’ Pacific Northwest.

Impact on wild populations

Some environmental groups have advocated favoring certain salmon catches over others.

Products

Most Atlantic salmon available on the world market are farmed, whereas the majority of Pacific salmon are wild-caught.

Canned salmon in the U.S. is usually wild from the Pacific Ocean, though some farmed salmon is available in cans. Smoked salmon is another preparation method, and can either be hot- or cold-smoked. Lox can refer either to cold-smoked salmon or to salmon cured in a brine solution (also called gravlax). Traditional canned salmon includes some skin (which is harmless) and bone (which adds calcium). Skinless and boneless canned salmon is also available.

Raw salmon flesh may contain Anisakis nematodes, marine parasites that cause anisakiasis. Before the availability of refrigeration, Japan did not consume raw salmon. Salmon and salmon roe have only recently come into use in making sashimi (raw fish) and sushi, with the introduction of parasite-free Norwegian salmon in the late 1980s.

Ordinary types of cooked salmon contain 500–1,500 mg DHA and 300–1,000 mg EPA (two similar species of fatty acids) per 100 grams

Dishes

Gallery

See also
 Salmon cannery
 Atlantic salmon
 Chum salmon

Notes

Further reading

Come back, salmon, By Molly Cone, Sierra Club Books, 48 pages,  - A book for juveniles describes the restoration of 'Pigeon Creek'.
The salmon: their fight for survival, By Anthony Netboy, 1973, Houghton Mifflin Co., 613 pages, 
Trading Tails: Linkages Between Russian Salmon Fisheries and East Asian Markets. Shelley Clarke. (November 2007). 120pp. .
"Last Stand of the American Salmon," G. Bruce Knecht for Men's Journal

External links

Plea for the Wanderer, an NFB documentary on West Coast salmon

Salmon
Alaskan cuisine
Commercial fish
Oily fish
 
Fish as food